Mezhdurechensk is the name of several inhabited localities in Russia.

Urban localities
Mezhdurechensk, Kemerovo Oblast, a city in Kemerovo Oblast; administratively incorporated as a city under oblast jurisdiction
Mezhdurechensk, Komi Republic, an urban-type settlement in Udorsky District of the Komi Republic
Mezhdurechensk, Samara Oblast, an urban-type settlement in Syzransky District of Samara Oblast

Rural localities
Mezhdurechensk, Ivanovo Oblast, a selo in Teykovsky District of Ivanovo Oblast

See also
Mezhdurechensky (inhabited locality)
Mezhdurechye